Teesquay Millennium Footbridge is a footbridge crossing east-west over the River Tees between Stockton high street and Thornaby (Teesdale Business Park) in Northern England. It is just east of Stockton town centre and in the town's namesake borough.

The bridge crosses the Teesdale Way cycle route, River Tees, and the A1035 Riverside Road.  Funding for the bridge was from Stockton-on-Tees Council, the European Regional Development Fund, One NorthEast, and English Partnerships.

Teesquay Millennium Footbridge is also referred to as the Millennium Bridge.

Design 

Stockton Borough Council provided a brief for a 'design and build' competition to construct a pedestrian bridge across the River Tees.
The 'design and build' competition was won by a team comprising Ove Arup and Birse Construction.
Their entry was the only one to satisfy the local council's strictly limited budget.

The bridge has a cable-stayed design with architecture by Yee Associates
and designed by Ove Arup
whereas the identification signage on the bridge states that it was designed by the constructor, Birse Construction.
It has a  'A' frame pylon/mast with fanned cables

Construction 

The bridge was fabricated in Spain, constructed on site by Birse Construction North East and completed in December 2000 at a cost of £1.4m.

Operation 

The bridge was opened on 20 December 2000 by Dari Taylor, Member of Parliament for Stockton South, and the mayor of Stockton-on-Tees.
The Teesgate Millennium Footbridge was one of the few number of millennium footbridges to be actually completed in the millennium year, but unlike some high-profile millennium footbridges it was not funded by the Millennium Commission.

The bridge has been criticised for both wobbling
and being too narrow to accommodate cyclists who are required to dismount and are barred from entering the Castlegate Centre in any case.

Castlegate Quay 

Up-river on Castlegate Quay by the western side of the bridge there is the Castlegate Quay Watersports Centre.

Photo gallery

See also 

 Other Millennium Bridges.

References

External links 

 Teesquay Millennium Footbridge on the Bridges on the Tyne website
 
 Tees Quay Millennium Bridge on Geograph
 Replica HM Bark Endeavour
 Castlegate Quay Watersports Centre.

Pedestrian bridges in England
Crossings of the River Tees
Bridges completed in 2000
Bridges in County Durham
Bridges in North Yorkshire
Buildings and structures in Stockton-on-Tees
Cable-stayed bridges in England
Buildings and structures celebrating the third millennium
2000 establishments in England